Neloufer de Mel is a professor of English at the University of Colombo in Sri Lanka and a feminist scholar.

As a child, she attended Bishop's College, a private girls' school in Colombo.
She holds a PhD from the University of Kent, where her 1990 dissertation was entitled "Responses to History: The Re-articulation of Postcolonial Identity in the Plays of Wole Soyinka & Derek Walcott 1950–76".

In 1999, de Mel was awarded a MacArthur Foundation grant;
in 2009 she was a Fulbright Scholar at Yale University;
and in 2019 she was a Dresden Senior Fellow at TU Dresden.

Much of her work has focused on cultural studies of postwar Sri Lanka from a perspective of feminism, justice, and the arts.
She has written extensively on the militarization of Sri Lankan society during the quarter-century of ethnic war, and its lingering effects after the war's end.

De Mel is also interested in multidisciplinary studies of gender, literature, film, and performance art and has served on juries for literature and film prizes and festivals.

Works

Books
 Women and the Nation's Narrative: Gender and Nationalism in Twentieth Century Sri Lanka (2001)
 Militarizing Sri Lanka: Popular Culture, Memory and Narrative in the Armed Conflict (2007)

References

Living people
People from Colombo
Sri Lankan women academics
English-language writers from Sri Lanka
21st-century Sri Lankan writers
21st-century Sri Lankan women writers
Alumni of the University of Kent
Academic staff of the University of Colombo
Sri Lankan feminists
English literature academics
Peace and conflict scholars
Year of birth missing (living people)